District Council of Wakefield could refer to multiple current and former municipalities in the vicinity of the lower Wakefield River in South Australia:
 District Council of Port Wakefield (1878-1983)
 District Council of Wakefield Plains (1983-1997)
 Wakefield Regional Council (established 1997)